Point Pleasant Historic District is a national historic district located in Point Pleasant, Plumstead Township and Tinicum Township, Bucks County, Pennsylvania.  The district includes 74 contributing buildings and 4 contributing structures in the riverfront and resort village of Point Pleasant. They include a variety of residential, commercial, and institutional buildings. The buildings are predominantly 2 1/2-story, stone and frame, gable roofed structures reflective of vernacular Greek Revival, Italianate, and Bungalow/craftsman styles. Notable buildings include "The Brambles," Thomas Schwartz House (c. 1840), Stover Mansion (Tattersall Inn), Point Pleasant School (1850), Baptist Church (1852), Point Pleasant Hotel (c. 1840), Jacob Sutters Hotel (c. 1870), Waterman's Inn (1832), and the Stover Grist and Saw Mill (c. 1742).  The contributing structures are four bridges that cross the Pennsylvania Canal.

It was added to the National Register of Historic Places in 1989.

References

External links
Tattersall Inn at the Stover Mansion website

Historic districts in Bucks County, Pennsylvania
Greek Revival architecture in Pennsylvania
Italianate architecture in Pennsylvania
Historic districts on the National Register of Historic Places in Pennsylvania
National Register of Historic Places in Bucks County, Pennsylvania